Manuel Fernández Caballero (Murcia, 14 March 1835 – Madrid, 26 February 1906) was a Spanish composer, notably of zarzuelas.

His works were seminal works in the young Género chico form of zarzuela. The success of Los bandos de villafrita (1884) consolidated his career. Its sequel was Las grandes figuras (1885). The sainete El dúo de La Africana and its celebrated jota No cantes más La Africana remain as classic examples of a zarzuela duet.

Works
He also composed religious works and salon songs. The Murcian musician was one of the great Spanish composers of the nineteenth century, having such a number of successful premieres that since his first great success Entre el alcalde y el rey and El lucero del alba composed for the light tip Antonia Garcia de Videgain in the eighties, until his last works passes more than a hundred productions

Zarzuelas

 Entre el alcalde y el rey (1875).
 La Marsellesa (1876)
 :es:Los sobrinos del Capitán Grant (1877)
 :es:El lucero del alba (1879)
 Currilla (1883).
 Chateau Margaux (1887)
 :es:El dúo de La africana (1893)
 :es:El cabo primero (1895)
 :es:La viejecita (1897)
 Gigantes y Cabezudos (1899)

References

External links
 Biografías y Vidas: Manuel Fernández Caballero
 Radio Beethoven: Manuel Fernández Caballero
 photos of Dúo de la Africana by Innova Lyrica
 [https://web.archive.org/web/20190701231249/http://soundclick.com/share?songid=6191627 “Gigantes y Cabezudos – Coro de Repatriados” Mp3·] ISWC T-0425363558 Versión autorizada''

1835 births
1906 deaths
19th-century Spanish composers
19th-century Spanish male musicians
Male opera composers
People from Murcia
Spanish classical composers
Spanish male classical composers
Spanish opera composers